Leonard Savill (1869–1959) was an eminent Anglican clergyman in the mid 20th century.

Savill was educated at Charterhouse; Jesus College, Cambridge; and Ripon College, Cuddesdon. He was ordained deacon in 1892; and priest in 1894. He was a curate at St Bartholomew-the-Great, Smithfield from 1902 until 1916. He was the incumbent at Swanley from 1916 to 1925; and Rural Dean of Dartford from 1919 to 1925 before his appointment as Tonbridge. He retired in 1939, and died on 21 October 1959. Savill is buried at Turners Hill, West Sussex.

References

1869 births
1959 deaths
People educated at Charterhouse School
Alumni of Jesus College, Cambridge
Alumni of Ripon College Cuddesdon
Archdeacons of Tonbridge